Weibin District is a district of the city of Xinxiang, Henan province, China.

Administrative divisions
As 2012, this district is divided to 7 subdistricts and 1 township.
Subdistricts

Townships
Pingyuan Township

References

County-level divisions of Henan
Xinxiang